Fort Alexander may refer to:
Fort Alexander (Hawaii)
Fort Alexander, Manitoba
Fort Alexander (St. Petersburg)